Cleo  (born Clementina Cote, 1943–2007) was a French fauvist neo-impressionist painter.

Biography
Clementina Cote was born near Lyon in 1943. Her youth fell 1960s - the time of "Flower children, the sexual revolution and the creation of communes.

Cleo, pseudonym or abbreviation from her name and her family name - Clementina Cote, she invented for herself as a protest against her family name. Cleo, thus she was known in communes and in Giverny and like this she signed her paintings.

The rebel, Cleo didn't recognize all official art and any critic. Although she got artistic education in the Academy of Fine Arts, Cleo denied the power of museums and auctions.

In her youth she idolized Pablo Picasso. When Cleo was sixteen she escaped from home to Paris to become a disciple of Picasso. Cleo was lucky - the maestro gave her some lessons in his Paris studio. Later, her life crossed with other artists - Dalí and Chagall.

There were three periods in her life and art.

The first is the life in communes throughout the world: in Europe, England, USA right after Academy of Fine Arts. The paintings of this period are impressive, impetuous and full of unchecked sexuality. At this time Cleo bore two children.

The second period passed under the sign of Monet. She lived in the village of Giverny, where Monet passed his late years. Her paintings become more restrained, with a big harmony of colours so characteristic of Monet. In her works some subjects appear which were absent before: still lifes, flowers, views of Giverny. At that time her artistic style became a mixture of fauvism and neo-impressionism.

The third period is her return to home and to her children. She lived a calm, measured life, entirely devoted to art. Cleo died at Lyons in 2007 at the age of 64.

External links
  Cleo (Clementina Cote) biography

1943 births
2007 deaths
20th-century French painters
21st-century French painters
Post-impressionist painters

French art
French women painters